Tervoorst is a hamlet in the municipality of Beekdaelen in the province of Limburg, the Netherlands.

The hamlet contains approximately 105 houses, located in a linear pattern along the Voorsterstraat and the Horenweg, which run from the village of Nuth until the hamlet Brand. The Platsbeek river flows to the north of the settlement. In the south there is a hill supporting the nearby Hunnecum hamlet's windmill as well as houses situated on its slopes.

References

 ANWB (2005) Topografische Atlas Limburg 1:25000, 2e druk, p. 69 

Populated places in Limburg (Netherlands)
Beekdaelen